The 2022 Grand Est Open 88 was a professional women's tennis tournament played on outdoor clay courts. It was the fifteenth edition of the tournament and first ever as a WTA 125 event, which is also part of the 2022 WTA 125 tournaments. It took place in Contrexéville, France between 4 and 10 July 2022.

Singles main-draw entrants

Seeds

 1 Rankings are as of 27 June 2022.

Other entrants
The following players received wildcards into the singles main draw:
  Audrey Albié
  Julie Gervais
  Margaux Rouvroy
  Stefanie Vögele

The following player received entry using a protected ranking:
  Zoe Hives

The following players received entry from the qualifying draw:
  Erika Andreeva
  Lena Papadakis
  Alice Robbe
  Camilla Rosatello

Withdrawals 
Before the tournament
  Tessah Andrianjafitrimo → replaced by  Fernanda Contreras Gómez
  Ana Bogdan → replaced by  Olivia Gadecki
  Tamara Korpatsch → replaced by  Sara Errani
  Tatjana Maria → replaced by  Oksana Selekhmeteva
  Diane Parry → replaced by  Elsa Jacquemot
  Harmony Tan → replaced by  María Carlé

Doubles main-draw entrants

Seeds

1 Rankings are as of 27 June 2022.

Other entrants
The following pair received a wildcard into the doubles main draw:
  Alice Robbe /  Margaux Rouvroy

Champions

Singles

  Sara Errani def.  Dalma Gálfi 6–4, 1–6, 7–6(7–4)

Doubles

  Ulrikke Eikeri /  Tereza Mihalíková def.  Han Xinyun /  Alexandra Panova 7–6(10–8), 6–2

References

External links
 Official website

2022 WTA 125 tournaments
2022 in French tennis
July 2022 sports events in France
Grand Est Open 88